Alan Manfred Holyoake (born December 1945) is a British businessman and philatelist who is a specialist in the stamps and postal history of Great Britain and a fellow of the Royal Philatelic Society London.

Holyoake was awarded the Grand Prix for the best exhibit at the London 2010 International Stamp Exhibition for his display of The First Line Engraved Postage Stamps. In 2017 he was appointed to the Roll of Distinguished Philatelists.

Selected publications
Great Britain: the development and use of the first issues. Collectors Club of New York, 2009. OCLC No. 785955712
Great Britain secured delivery of mail 1450-1862. The Great Britain Philatelic Society, 2012.

References

External links
Alan Holyoake in 2011.
In London, registered mail's origins on display, March 2011.

British philatelists
Fellows of the Royal Philatelic Society London
Living people
1945 births
Signatories to the Roll of Distinguished Philatelists